The St. John the Baptist Church is a historic Russian Orthodox Church in Angoon, Alaska, United States. Now it is under Diocese of Alaska of the Orthodox Church in America

This modest wood-frame village church was built 1928–1929, after a fire destroyed the previous church of the parish, at Killisnoo, in 1927. Its gabled roof is topped by a square cupola, which is topped by an Orthodox cross. A bell tower rises from the west end above the vestibule.

The church was listed on the National Register of Historic Places in 1980.

See also
National Register of Historic Places listings in Hoonah-Angoon Census Area, Alaska

References 

Buildings and structures in Hoonah–Angoon Census Area, Alaska
Churches on the National Register of Historic Places in Alaska
Churches completed in 1929
Russian Orthodox church buildings in Alaska
Buildings and structures on the National Register of Historic Places in Hoonah–Angoon Census Area, Alaska